Carstairs Douglas (born 27 December 1830 in Kilbarchan, Renfrewshire; died 26 July 1877 in Xiamen, China) was a Scottish missionary, remembered chiefly for his writings concerning the Southern Min language of Fujian, in particular his Chinese–English Dictionary of the Vernacular or Spoken Language of Amoy.

Early life
Castairs Douglas was born a son of the manse in Kilbarchan in Renfrewshire, Scotland, the youngest or second-youngest of seven children. His father Rev Robert Douglas, was the parish minister, and his elder brother Robert was also closely involved in the church. His brother George also joined the church and served as Moderator of the General Assembly to the Free Church of Scotland 1894/95/

Douglas studied at the University of Glasgow from 1845 until 1851, gaining an MA degree, and was later awarded the LL.D. by his alma mater in recognition of his scholarly achievements. Going on to study Divinity at the University of Edinburgh, Douglas professed a keen interest in missionary work. He was ordained in February 1855 and set sail for China a month later.

Mission to Amoy (Xiamen)
As one of the treaty ports opened to Westerners in 1842, Xiamen (then known in the West as Amoy) was one of the few places in China where missionaries could go about their work relatively unmolested. During his tenure Douglas was responsible for increasing the single church in Xiamen to a congregation of twenty-five churches, composed mostly of Chinese members. Contemporaries of Douglas were heavily involved in producing material concerned with the local language, including Elihu Doty who wrote the Anglo-Chinese Manual with Romanized Colloquial in the Amoy Dialect and John Van Nest Talmage, author of the Ê-Mn̂g Im ê Jī-tián (Dictionary of the Amoy Speech). While stationed in Xiamen, Douglas, alongside fellow Scottish medical missionary H. L. Mackenzie, visited Formosa (modern-day Taiwan) and was influential in the decision by the English Presbyterian Mission to send missionaries to the island. In his last significant position Douglas was elected joint Chairman of the Shanghai Missionary Conference of 1877, a gathering of 150 or so missionaries employed in the China field.

Published works

Amoy–English Dictionary
During twenty-two years as a Presbyterian missionary in Xiamen Douglas amassed a wealth of information on the Southern Min language spoken in the area, eventually compiling his Chinese–English Dictionary of the Vernacular or Spoken Language of Amoy (1873), which was the first comprehensive Southern Min–English dictionary and indeed the first dictionary of "living" Southern Min in any language; it remains an important work in the understanding of the language. The dictionary used an early version of the Peh-oe-ji romanisation to represent the sounds of Southern Min, with pronunciations from both the Zhangzhou and Quanzhou dialects of Southern Min, along with literary readings for many of the entries.

Douglas felt that in regards to his work...  

Douglas' hope was ended by his early death, although fifty years after the initial publication of his dictionary just such an appendix was added, by the Reverend Thomas Barclay, a missionary stationed in Tainan, Qing-era Taiwan who had himself much benefited from the volume.

Death and memorial
Douglas died of cholera on 26 July 1877 at the age of 46 in his adopted home of Xiamen and was buried on Gulangyu. He is memorialised in a stained-glass window in St. Bryce Kirk, Kirkcaldy which was dedicated by his brother Robert Douglas, an elder of the kirk.

Family

Douglas's nephew (son of his brother Robert) was the eminent hygienist Prof Carstairs Cumming Douglas, named in his memory.

References

Bibliography

External links
 
Preface to his dictionary
Carstairs Douglas Online Memorial

1830 births
1877 deaths
Scottish Presbyterian missionaries
Presbyterian missionaries in China
Christian missionaries in Fujian
British expatriates in China
Alumni of the University of Glasgow
Alumni of the University of Edinburgh
Scottish linguists
Southern Min
19th-century Ministers of the Free Church of Scotland
Missionary linguists